William C. Wilson (July 2, 1812 – April 16, 1882) was a Vermont lawyer and judge who served as an associate justice of the Vermont Supreme Court from 1865 to 1869.

Biography
William Campbell Wilson was born in Cambridge, Vermont on July 2, 1812, the son of Jennett (Campbell) Wilson (1784-1846) and farmer John Wilson (1779-1830).  William Wilson was educated in the local schools of Cambridge and Jericho, and worked on the family farm until he was eighteen, after which he began teaching school and studying law.  He studied under Levi Joslyn in Cambridge, followed by study with Homer E. Hubbell of Fairfax, and then Bates Turner of St. Albans.  He was admitted to the bar in 1834, and practiced in Bakersfield, where he also operated a school for prospective attorneys, which trained between 80 and 100 students during the years it was in existence.  Wilson was also a town leader, and played a key role in the creation of Bakersfield's hotel and Methodist church, as well as the Bakersfield North Academy school.

Originally a Whig, and a Republican after the party's founding in the mid-1850s, Wilson was a delegate to the 1843 state constitutional convention, and served as Franklin County's State's Attorney from 1844 to 1845.  He served in the Vermont Senate from 1848 to 1849, and was an assistant judge of the Franklin County Court from 1849 to 1851.  In 1850, he was again a delegate to the state constitutional convention.  Wilson received the honorary degree of Master of Arts from the University of Vermont in 1853.  In 1855, Wilson served on the Council of Censors, the body which met every seven years to review actions of the state government and ensure their constitutionality.  In 1860, Wilson was an alternate delegate to the Republican National Convention.  From 1863 to 1865, Wilson represented Bakersfield in the Vermont House of Representatives.

In 1865, Wilson was appointed as an associate justice of the Vermont Supreme Court, and he served until 1869. His first wife died in 1869, and after resigning from the court, Wilson moved to Rochester, Minnesota to live near his daughters.  While living in Minnesota, Wilson remarried and began authoring a book on legal topics, but failing health caused him to discontinue the effort.  In his later years, breathing problems in cold weather caused him to spend winters in Florida.

Death and burial
Wilson died in Rochester, Minnesota on April 16, 1882.  He was buried at Maple Grove Cemetery in Bakersfield.

Family
In 1835, Wilson was married to Clarissa Ann Partridge Pratt (1817-1869) of Bakersfield.  They were the parents of a son and two daughters: William DeForest Wilson (1836-1900), an attorney in St. Albans, Vermont;  Elizabeth (1837-1926), the wife of attorney and judge Milton R. Tyler (1835-1907); and Clara (1843-1924), the wife of Judge Charles Monroe Start (1839-1919).  In 1872, Wilson married Mary Ann Brown of Rochester, Minnesota.  They remained married until her death in 1875.

References

Sources

Books

Newspapers

Internet

1812 births
1882 deaths
People from Cambridge, Vermont
People from Bakersfield, Vermont
Politicians from Rochester, Minnesota
U.S. state supreme court judges admitted to the practice of law by reading law
Vermont lawyers
Vermont Whigs
Vermont Republicans
State's attorneys in Vermont
Members of the Vermont House of Representatives
Vermont state senators
Vermont state court judges
Justices of the Vermont Supreme Court
Burials in Vermont
19th-century American judges
19th-century American lawyers